Linda Goranson (born 1947 in Toronto, Ontario) is a Canadian actress.

Career 
Linda Goranson is most noted for her performance in "The Spike in the Wall", a 1970 episode of the CBC Television drama anthology series The Manipulators, for which she won the Canadian Film Award for Best Actress in a Non-Feature at the 22nd Canadian Film Awards; her performance, in which her character removed her blouse to attract her husband's attention, was also controversial as the first topless scene ever broadcast on Canadian network television.

She also appeared in the films The Trap, The Rowdyman, Too Outrageous!, The Painted Door, Confidential, The Gate, Ordinary Magic, Harrison Bergeron, Dirty Pictures, Owning Mahowny and Drifting Snow, and had recurring roles in the television series The Whiteoaks of Jalna, The Newcomers, Traders and Cardinal. She is most prominently associated with stage roles, including productions of William Shakespeare's Measure for Measure, Jane Martin's Talking With..., Neil Simon's Brighton Beach Memoirs, Agatha Christie's And Then There Were None and Joe DiPietro's Over the River and Through the Woods.

Personal life 
She was married to film director Peter Carter until his death.

Filmography

Film

Television

References

External links

1947 births
Living people
20th-century Canadian actresses
21st-century Canadian actresses
Canadian film actresses
Canadian television actresses
Canadian stage actresses
Actresses from Toronto
Canadian Screen Award winners